Old St. Andrew's may refer to:

Old St Andrews, a brand of Scotch whisky
Old St. Andrew's Episcopal Church, or St. Andrew's Episcopal Church, a historic building in Jacksonville, Florida, USA
Old St. Andrew's Presbyterian Church, now St. Andrew's Evangelical Lutheran Church in Toronto, Ontario, Canada
Old St Andrew's Church, Kingsbury, a closed church in the Kingsbury area of Greater London